Kumaraswamy or Kumaraswami is a given name for a male South Indians. It may also refer to:

 Kumaraswamy distribution, a distribution form related to probability theory and statistics
 Murugan, also called Kumaraswami, most popular Hindu deity amongst Tamils of Tamil Nadu state in India
 Kumaraswamy Layout, a residential locality in southern Bangalore, India

See also
Coomaraswamy (disambiguation)
Kumarasamy (disambiguation)